The Fidonisy class, also known as the Kerch class, were a group of eight destroyers built for the Black Sea Fleet of the Imperial Russian Navy during World War I. They participated in World War I, the Russian Civil War, and World War II.

Design and description
In early 1914, several months before the beginning of World War I, the construction of a third series of eight destroyers based on Novik for the Black Sea Fleet was proposed by the Naval Ministry in response to a perceived strengthening of the Ottoman Navy. This was approved by Nicholas II on 24 June after the destroyers had received names in honor of the victories of Admiral Fyodor Ushakov on 16 June. Naval historian Siegfried Breyer considered the class to be the least successful of Noviks successors.

Their crew consisted of 136 officers and ratings.

Armament
The Fidonisy class were armed with four 60-calibre 102 mm Pattern 1911 Obukhov guns, one on the forecastle and three aft; one of these latter guns was superfiring over the other two. The guns had a rate of fire of 12–15 rounds per minute. Each ship stowed 150 rounds per gun.

Anti-aircraft armament varied between ships. The first four were completed either with a pair of 39-calibre  "pom-pom" guns or 58-calibre  Hotchkiss guns. The second batch of four were fitted with a single 30-calibre  Lender gun. It had a practical rate of fire of 10–12 rounds per minute.

The ships were also armed with a dozen  torpedo tubes in four triple mounts amidships. They probably most often used the M1912 torpedo which had a  warhead. The ships could also carry 80 mines.

Ships
The ships were ordered on 17 March 1915 and all eight were built in the Russud Shipyard in Nikolaev.

Service
Only Fidonisy was completed in time to participate in combat, helping to sink some Turkish sailing ships in October 1917, before the navy ceased offensive operations against the Central Powers in response to the Bolshevik Decree on Peace in early November before a formal Armistice was signed the next month.

References

Bibliography

Further reading
 

Destroyer classes
Destroyers of the Imperial Russian Navy
Wrangel's fleet
Destroyers of the Soviet Navy